"In and Out of Love" is a single by American rock band Bon Jovi. It is taken from their second album, 7800° Fahrenheit

Overview
The song also featured on the band's best-of album Cross Road, and Disc Two of their Greatest Hits album. A live version of the song, recorded in Tokyo during summer 1985, can be found on the album One Wild Night Live 1985-2001.

In an interview, Bon Jovi said that he wrote the song while watching MTV's Top 20 Video Countdown.

Cash Box said that it "kicks into gear from the start and never lets go" and has a strong melody.

The single entered the Billboard Rock chart in July 1985, peaking at No. 37. It entered the Hot 100 in August and peaked at No. 69, holding that position for two weeks.

Chart performance

References 

1985 songs
1985 singles
Bon Jovi songs
Songs written by Jon Bon Jovi
PolyGram singles